Steffi Graf was the defending champion and won in the final 6–3, 7–5 against Arantxa Sánchez Vicario.

Seeds
A champion seed is indicated in bold text while text in italics indicates the round in which that seed was eliminated. The top eight seeds received a bye to the second round.

  Steffi Graf (champion)
  Arantxa Sánchez Vicario (final)
  Gabriela Sabatini (quarterfinals)
  Amanda Coetzer (third round)
  Helena Suková (semifinals)
  Judith Wiesner (third round)
  Sabine Hack (quarterfinals)
  Lori McNeil (third round)
  Natalia Medvedeva (quarterfinals)
 n/a
  Yayuk Basuki (second round)
  Julie Halard (third round)
  Brenda Schultz (third round)
  Chanda Rubin (semifinals)
  Miriam Oremans (second round)
  Stephanie Rottier (quarterfinals)
  Florencia Labat (third round)

Draw

Finals

Top half

Section 1

Section 2

Bottom half

Section 3

Section 4

References
 1994 Virginia Slims of Florida Draw

Virginia Slims of Florida
1994 WTA Tour